Khuddar ( Self-Respecting) is a 1994 Indian Hindi-language action film directed by Iqbal Durrani and starring Govinda, Karishma Kapoor and Kader Khan. Other cast includes Shakti Kapoor, Shreeram Lagoo, Anjana Mumtaz, Raju Shrestha, Mahesh Anand, Vikas Anand, Navneet Nishaan and Anil Dhawan. It includes the controversial number "Sexy Sexy Mujhe Log Bole", which was censored to "Baby Baby Mujhe Log Bole". It is a remake of the Tamil film Walter Vetrivel, starring Sathyaraj. Dialogues of this movie became very popular, and therefore, audio cassettes of dialogues were released.

Plot
Shastri Suri (Shreeram Lagoo) comes from a middle-class yet honest background. He has raised his son, police inspector Siddhant Suri (Govinda) and daughter Bindiya and second son Nandu (Raju Shrestha) in a similar way. But Nandu has fallen into bad company. He is in debt and unable to repay his debt. Therefore, he decides to rob and does so at the house belonging to Pooja (Karisma Kapoor). When Pooja confronts him, he attacks her, and as a result, Pooja loses her sight. A blind Pooja subsequently weds Siddhant, not knowing that her assailant is her brother-in-law. Shastriji's employee Kanhaiyalal (Kader Khan) is greedy and ambitious. When Shastriji stands for election, he is opposed strongly by corrupt and avaricious Adarsh Vardhan (Shakti Kapoor). By hook and crook, Adarsh wins the election and decides to humiliate the Suri family. He asks that his bodyguard be none other than Siddhant Suri. Siddhant must now choose between staying with the police force and serving his corrupt master.

Siddhant chooses to serve, but only so that he can find out more about the corrupt minister and his dealings and to reveal the same to the public. Siddhant finally discloses the same to the public gathered in a rally, and the minister is forced to flee the scene. Pooja's eyes are operated upon, and her vision is restored. She identifies Nandu, and Siddhant takes revenge on his brother.

Cast
Govinda as Police Inspector Siddhant Suri, Pooja's husband
Karishma Kapoor as Pooja Suri, Siddhant's wife
Kader Khan as Kanhaiyalal
Shakti Kapoor as Adarsh Vardhan
Shreeram Lagoo as Shastri Suri
Anjana Mumtaz as Mrs Suri
Raju Shrestha as Nandkishore “Nandu” Suri
Aarti Nagpal as Bindiya, Siddhant's sister
Mahesh Anand as Babujaan
Vikas Anand as Doctor
Achyut Potdar as Police Commissioner 
Navneet Nishan as Jenny/Tara Sehgal/Seth in Episode 72 Tara TV series.
Anil Dhawan as Press Reporter
Adi Irani as Anand
Rami Reddy as Swami
Jack Gaud as Kapali
Subbiraj as Father of Adarsh Vardhan (Uncredited) Seen only in the photo frame

Soundtrack

Govinda's accident
Govinda narrowly escaped death on 5 January 1994 while traveling to a studio for the shooting of Khuddar. The actor's car collided with another car, resulting in him sustaining injuries to his head. Though bleeding profusely, Govinda did not cancel the shooting. After visiting a doctor, he shot for the film till midnight.

References

External links
 

1994 films
1990s Hindi-language films
Indian action films
Hindi remakes of Tamil films
Fictional portrayals of the Maharashtra Police
Films scored by Anu Malik
Indian police films
1994 action films
1990s police films